William Whiting (1 November 1825 – 3 May 1878) was an English writer and hymnist, best known for his 1860 hymn "Eternal Father, Strong to Save" (often called "The Navy Hymn", used by the Royal Navy for church services and later adopted by the US Navy).

He was born in Kensington, England, and educated at Clapham and Winchester College. Because of his musical ability, he became master of Winchester College Choristers' School.  While best known for "Eternal Father, Strong to Save", Whiting also published two poetry collections: Rural Thoughts (1851) and Edgar Thorpe, or the Warfare of Life (1867). He died at Winchester.

References

External links
 William Whiting at CyberHymnal.org.

English hymnwriters
English male poets
1825 births
1878 deaths